Calcium monosilicide (CaSi) is an inorganic compound, a silicide of calcium. It can be prepared by reacting elemental calcium and silicon at temperatures above 1000 °C. It is a Zintl phase, where silicon has oxidation state −2 and covalence 2.

References

Alkaline earth silicides
Calcium compounds